Herrera International Airport  was an airport located in Santo Domingo, Dominican Republic. Herrera used to be the hub of most Dominican airlines before being closed in 2006 and replaced by La Isabela International Airport, also in Santo Domingo. The airport had domestic flights and connections to Puerto Rico, Cuba, and other Caribbean islands.

History
The airport began commercial operations in 1973. The airport was formally closed on February 23, 2006, when it was handed over to the military, who blocked the runway with vehicles.

There are plans to convert the site of the former airport into a park.

Flights were moved either to La Isabela or to Las Américas International Airport.

External links

Live flight tracker of Herrera Intl at Flight Aware 
 American Eagle at HEX from San Juan

References 

Airports in the Dominican Republic
Defunct airports
Airports established in 1973
1973 establishments in the Dominican Republic
Airports disestablished in 2006
2006 disestablishments in the Dominican Republic